On November 21, 2021, Darrell E. Brooks Jr. drove a sport utility vehicle (SUV) through the annual Christmas parade in Waukesha, Wisconsin, United States, killing six people and injuring sixty-two others.

Brooks pleaded not guilty to six counts of first-degree intentional homicide and seventy-one additional charges, and knowingly and voluntarily chose to represent himself at his trial, which began on October 3, 2022. Brooks presented pseudolegal arguments from the sovereign citizen movement and was repeatedly removed from the courtroom for failing to comply with decorum and courtesy. On October 26, 2022, a jury found Brooks guilty on all seventy-six charges. He was sentenced to six consecutive life sentences without the possibility of parole, plus an additional 763 years and 3 months, to be served consecutively on November 16, 2022.

Background 
Waukesha, a western suburb of Milwaukee, Wisconsin, has a traditional, annual Christmas parade downtown. In 2020, the parade was cancelled due to the COVID-19 pandemic. The 2021 parade, the 58th annual event, featured more than 60 entries and had the theme of "Comfort and Joy".

Attack 

On November 21, 2021, around 4:39 p.m. One police officer banged on the hood of the SUV in an attempt to get the driver to stop. In the final stage of the rampage, an officer fired his gun in an attempt to stop the vehicle.

The parade was live-streamed, and other attendees captured the incident on videos later posted to social media. Two eyewitnesses told reporters that the driver did not initially stop; all they could hear was people screaming and crying. One witness described the driver as "calm and composed". Police reported that the driver deliberately targeted the crowd, driving in a "zig-zag pattern" to hit as many people as possible.

Victims 

During the immediate aftermath of the ramming, five people were confirmed killed and forty-eight others were injured. The five dead were identified as four women and one man. Four of the dead were members of the Milwaukee Dancing Grannies, a dance group composed solely of grandmothers.

Hospitals admitted twenty-eight people, nine of whom were in critical condition. Seventeen children were among the wounded, with three remaining hospitalized at Children's Wisconsin until early December.  By November 23, two days after the incident, the number of people reported injured had increased to sixty-two and the number of fatalities had increased to six after an eight-year-old child died at a hospital. The ages of the dead ranged from 8 to 81.

Aftermath 

The Waukesha Police Department issued a shelter-in-place order for parts of Waukesha but withdrew it the same evening. The Waukesha School District cancelled school on November 22 and made additional counselors available to students. On November 22, vigils were held across the city. A week after the attacks the city of Waukesha held a moment of silence.  Children's Wisconsin opened a crisis hotline for those seeking emotional and psychological support. First Lady Jill Biden met privately with victims' family members and attended a memorial to the victims on December 15.

Several donation efforts were made, with nearly $900,000 having been raised on GoFundMe for victims of the attack, and 7,000 donations being made raising over $1.8 million to the United for Waukesha Community Fund. In addition, local contractors volunteered to install wheelchair ramps in the homes of those injured from the attack who would need wheelchairs.

In March 2022, the United for Waukesha Community Fund announced that they had raised more than $6.2 million for the victims of the attack.

Perpetrator 

On the day of the attack, police recovered a damaged Ford Escape and arrested 39-year-old Darrell Edward Brooks Jr. (born February 21, 1982), who was born and raised in Milwaukee, and has an extensive criminal record dating back to 1999.

Brooks was arrested on the night of the attack, soon after he told a Waukesha resident that he was homeless and asked to use his phone to call an Uber. The man was unaware of the events that had occurred and permitted Brooks briefly inside his home, giving him a sandwich and letting him borrow a jacket but asked him to leave when police arrived. Brooks left the man's home and surrendered to police without incident.

It is believed Brooks acted alone and did not know anyone at the parade. Police investigated whether he was fleeing from a nearby domestic disturbance when encountering the parade. The police chief said, "We have information that the suspect prior to the incident was involved in a domestic disturbance, which was just minutes prior, and the suspect left that scene just prior to our arrival to that domestic disturbance." He also said that Brooks was not being chased by police when he drove into the parade route. Prosecutors have alleged that Brooks was trying to "strike and hurt as many people as possible".

A Facebook account reported to belong to Brooks contained viewpoints aligning with that of the Black Hebrew Israelites (BHI).  According to the Anti-Defamation League (ADL), his former social media accounts "indicate support for some conspiratorial, Black nationalist and antisemitic beliefs" and it also wrote that an image posted on his alleged former Facebook account in 2015 had originally been "circulated by members of the Black Hebrew Israelites". The ADL also wrote that while Brooks had shared conspiratorial-themed social media posts in 2015, "there appears to be little evidence that Brooks actively subscribes to an overarching extremist ideology."

Criminal history 
Brooks had been arrested three weeks prior to the Waukesha attack for hitting his ex-girlfriend, and ramming the woman with the same vehicle during a domestic dispute at a gas station in Milwaukee. The charges against him for that case include second-degree recklessly endangering safety with domestic abuse assessments, a felony, as well as disorderly conduct with domestic abuse assessments; misdemeanor battery with domestic abuse assessments; and obstructing an officer. Brooks posted $1,000 bail on November 19, two days before the Waukesha attack, and was released.

Brooks was also arrested five months and five weeks prior to the dispute for domestic violence while staying at the Country Hearth Inn in Union City, Georgia, when a witness told police that he confronted Brooks after hearing Brooks arguing and beating up his ex-girlfriend on the other side of the wall repeatedly in a hotel room. According to WXIA-TV, Brooks flashed a firearm in front of her during the argument. After spending the rest of the day behind bars at the East Point Law Enforcement Center in East Point, Brooks appeared in court the following day on May 28 and ended up receiving a signature bond, but never made it to its signature court date.

On July 24, 2020, while living in the Milwaukee community area of Arlington Heights near Shorewood, Brooks was charged with second-degree recklessly endangering safety and felon in possession of a firearm after he allegedly shot at his nephew and a friend after a fight over a cell phone near a North 19th Street house in the Milwaukee community area of North Division. Less than a year later on February 9, 2021, he was released with a $500 bond (that was originally set at $10,000).

At the time of the attack, Brooks also had an outstanding warrant for a statutory sex crime in Sparks, Nevada, which was issued in 2016. Nearly ten years earlier, in November 2006, he was convicted of a felony statutory sexual seduction after impregnating a 15-year-old girl in Sparks. After pleading guilty in March 2007, Brooks was sentenced to 12–36 months at the Northern Nevada Correctional Center in Carson City until being released in September 2008. Brooks also had previous criminality charges in two other Wisconsin cities, Manitowoc in 2005, and Wisconsin Rapids in 2010.

Legal proceedings

Pre-trial proceedings 
Brooks was initially charged with five counts of first-degree intentional homicide. Following the death of a sixth victim, Brooks's bond was set at $5 million, and he remained in custody, following an initial court appearance. The Waukesha County District Attorney said more charges were likely to come and charged Brooks with a sixth count of first degree intentional homicide on November 29.

Brooks was interviewed by Fox News while he was in custody and he said, "I just feel like I'm being monster–demonized." His mother wrote a letter to the media saying Brooks had a long history of mental health problems and no health insurance to pay for treatment. In December, Brooks was charged further for the November 21 incident, with charges of intimidating a witness and intimidation of a victim, both felonies. Brooks is alleged to have called his girlfriend from jail over several days and threatened her to prevent her cooperation with the investigation.

In January 2022, seventy-seven additional charges were filed against Brooks for the parade attack, including sixty-one counts of first-degree recklessly endangering safety with a dangerous weapon, six counts of hit and run involving death, two counts of felony bail jumping, and two counts of domestic abuse. The latter charges are in relation to two altercations between Brooks and his girlfriend on the day of the attack and the day before.

Trial and sentencing 
On January 14, 2022, Waukesha Court Commissioner Kevin Costello ruled in preliminary hearing that Brooks would stand trial due to "ample evidence on all fronts". Waukesha police detective Thomas Casey testified in the hearing as a witness, saying that he and other officers at the scene yelled at Brooks to stop. At the same time, Brooks zigzagged with his vehicle for blocks to strike pedestrians. Brooks's defense attorney Anna Kees argued that Brooks was high during the incident, noting that the police officers who arrested him noticed that Brooks smelled of cannabis and had red glassy eyes. Kees also claimed that Brooks did not intend to kill anyone, as he "couldn't bring himself" to look at photos of the victims. District Attorney Susan Opper counter-argued that all that Brooks had to do was stop and that even if he was intoxicated, he still committed multiple crimes.

On February 11, 2022, Brooks pleaded not guilty to all charges. Defense attorney Jeremy Perri entered two motions, requesting in the first one for a different trial in a different county, claiming that Brooks was unlikely to receive a fair and impartial jury trial in grief-stricken Waukesha, citing the "ubiquitous" Waukesha Strong solidarity movement within the county. The second motion requested a new judge for the case, for which no reason was given. Court Commissioner Costello denied the first motion but granted the second motion, reassigning the case from Judge Michael Bohren to Chief Judge Jennifer Dorow. One month later, Dorow scheduled Brooks's trial for October 3, 2022, at the Waukesha County Circuit Court. Before jury selection, one count of domestic battery was dropped by the prosecutors.

In a pre-trial hearing, Brooks requested self-representation. Judge Dorow considered the request and ruled that Brooks could proceed pro se. During proceedings, Brooks used arguments from the sovereign citizen movement, a pseudolegal movement whose adherents claim that courts do not have jurisdiction over them. Brooks declared himself to be "sovereign", stated that he did not consent to being recognized by his name, asked if the court was "a common law court or an admiralty law court", and argued that since the state of Wisconsin was an entity rather than a person, it could not file a claim against him. These arguments have not succeeded before in criminal trials; Judge Dorow ruled that Brooks was not allowed to argue that he was a sovereign citizen in court, stating that the defense was without merit.

During his trial, Brooks was repeatedly removed from the courtroom after failing to comply with decorum; some of these instances included Brooks engaging in numerous interruptions, back talking, glaring, and other outbursts with Judge Dorow. On October 24, 2022, Brooks was given the chance to offer the defense; however, due to Brooks's repeated misbehavior and failing to follow decorum, Judge Dorow ruled that he had forfeited his right to call further witnesses (which would have included his mother) and declared the evidentiary stage of the trial over. Closing arguments began on October 25, and the jury deliberations began that same day.

Before giving his closing argument, Brooks asked Judge Dorow if she had instructed the jury on jury nullification. Dorow sent the jury away so that she could warn Brooks, outside their presence, that he was not allowed to make that argument. Dorow cited case law which held that jury nullification was not a proper argument and that she had the power to shut down any argument that went outside the bounds of the law. Brooks engaged in a lengthy debate with the judge, during which he insisted that he be allowed to "inform the jury of the truth". Dorow maintained her position and warned Brooks that if he persisted in raising the issue of jury nullification, he would forfeit his right to give a closing argument. Eventually, the prosecution suggested that rather than immediately revoking his right to a closing argument, Brooks would be allowed to make his closing argument, and the prosecution would handle any improper arguments through objection. The judge agreed. Within the first minute of his closing argument, Brooks argued for jury nullification. The prosecution swiftly objected and the jury was told to disregard the argument.

On October 26, the jury returned with guilty verdicts on all seventy-six counts, after deliberating for a total of three hours and fifteen minutes.

Brooks was sentenced on November 16, 2022. Judge Dorow imposed six life sentences without parole, one for each of the deceased victims, to be served consecutively. For the sixty-one counts of reckless endangerment, she sentenced Brooks to a total of 762 years of initial confinement and 305 years of extended supervision. For the six counts of hit-and-run, Brooks received 150 years to run concurrently with the reckless endangerment sentences.

Post-trial  
After conviction and sentencing, Brooks filed for an appeal. He filed a motion for a stay of judgment pending appeal. He was placed on a suicide prevention protocol. As of November 23, 2022, he is confined at Waupun's Dodge Correctional Institution.

Response 
Wisconsin Governor Tony Evers expressed gratitude for the efforts of first responders and good Samaritans, and voiced support for affected families and community members. Evers ordered the United States and Wisconsin flags to be flown at half-staff the day after the incident in honor of the victims. President of the United States Joe Biden condemned the incident, calling it a "horrific act of violence". Wisconsin senators Tammy Baldwin and Ron Johnson released a joint statement, asking people to avoid using the event for political purposes. Pope Francis sent prayers and condolences to the victims on a message signed on his behalf. Waukesha County Executive Paul Farrow posted on social media and stated: "Please pray for our community tonight after the horrific events at the Waukesha Christmas Parade."

The attack triggered a backlash against bail reform. Brooks was released on $1,000 bail two weeks before the attack when he was arrested for allegedly running over a woman with his vehicle during an altercation, and the attack came at a time when the COVID-19 pandemic had resulted in courts wanting to reduce jail crowding to reduce risk of infection by giving lower bail requests. The bail, however, was not a result of any systemic changes to Waukesha's pretrial system; the office of the Milwaukee District Attorney John T. Chisholm, which set his bail, said in a statement that "the State's bail recommendation in this case was inappropriately low in light of the nature of the recent charges and the pending charges against Mr. Brooks", and said that bail was a result of "human error" of an overworked assistant district attorney. A court commissioner who was also involved in setting the bail was indefinitely reassigned to non-criminal cases.

The Anti-Defamation League (ADL) reported that the contents of Brooks' alleged Facebook account, which contained viewpoints aligning with Black Hebrew Israelites, and his crime, was exploited by white supremacists in order to push racist and antisemitic conspiracy theories, claiming Brooks' attack was racially motivated, that he killed his victims specifically because he hated white people, and that Jewish people were attempting to cover up the incident.

Notes

References

External links 

 News Chopper 12's aerial view of holiday parade horror – WISN-TV
 Ring camera shows Waukesha parade suspect's arrest - The Washington Post
 2021 Waukesha Christmas Parade

2021 in Wisconsin
2021 murders in the United States
2021 road incidents
2020s road incidents in North America
2020s trials
21st-century mass murder in the United States
Attacks in the United States in 2021
Attacks on parades
Crimes in Wisconsin
Filmed deaths in the United States
Mass murder in 2021
Mass murder in Wisconsin
Massacres in 2021
Murder trials
November 2021 crimes in the United States
Road incident deaths in Wisconsin
Incidents involving the sovereign citizen movement
Vehicular rampage in the United States
Christmas parade attack